The City Hall in Delft is a Renaissance style building on the Markt across from the Nieuwe Kerk. It is the seat of the city's government as well as a popular venue for civic wedding ceremonies. Most administrative functions have been transferred to an office inside the Delft railway station building. Originally designed by the Dutch architect Hendrick de Keyser, it was heavily changed over the centuries and was restored in the 20th century to its Renaissance appearance.

History

In the town hall from 1618 are some group portraits, and portraits of the counts of Orange and Nassau, including several by Michiel van Mierevelt (1567–1641), one of the earliest Dutch portrait painters, and with his son Pieter (1595–1623), a native of Delft. The oldest part of the complex is the belfry covered in "Gobertanger" limestone from Wallonia, a building material used often in important renaissance buildings in the Netherlands up to 1600. The tower, called "De Steen" or "The Stone", was originally built around 1300 and has decorative clockfaces from 1536 and the bells were made by Hendrick van Trier and Francois Hemony. The facade has a "Justitia" statue. Under the tower is an old city prison where the assassin of Willem the Silent, Balthasar Gérard, was kept before sentencing.

Up the stairway and immediately behind the heavy wooden entrance doors is the Vierschaar, with a decorative painting of the Judgment of Solomon by Pieter van Bronckhorst.

Vierschaar

Other views

References

Buildings and structures completed in the 17th century
Delft
Rijksmonuments in Delft